Treisbach may refer to two rivers of Hesse, Germany:

Treisbach (Gilsa), tributary of the Gilsa
Treisbach (Wetschaft), tributary of the Wetschaft

See also: Dreisbach (disambiguation)